The Bakersfield Symphony Orchestra (BSO) is an American orchestra based in Bakersfield, California. Founded in 1932, BSO plays its concerts at the Mechanics Bank Theater and Convention Center.  On October 8, 2022, BSO opened it's 91st season.

Stilian Kirov has been the music director of the BSO since 2015 and is currently contracted through 2026.

References

Musical groups established in 1932
Orchestras based in California